Anolis charlesmyersi is a species of lizard in the family Dactyloidae. The species is native to Central America.

Etymology
The specific name, charlesmyersi, is in honor of American herpetologist Charles William Myers.

Geographic range
A. charlesmyersi is found in Costa Rica and Panama.

Habitat
The preferred natural habitat of A. charlesmyersi is forest.

Description
A. charlesmyersi is medium-sized for its genus. The tail is relatively short, 1 – 1.5 times SVL. The hind legs are very short for the genus. The dewlap is brick red, with rows of white spots.

Reproduction
A. charlesmyersi is oviparous.

References

Further reading
Köhler G (2010). "A revision of the Central American species related to Anolis pentaprion with the resurrection of A. beckeri and the description of a new species (Squamata: Polychrotidae)". Zootaxa 2354: 1–18. (Anolis charlesmyersi, new species). (in English, with an abstract in Spanish).
Nicholson KE, Crother BI, Guyer C, Savage JM (2012). "It is time for a new classification of anoles (Squamata: Dactyloidae)". Zootaxa 3477: 1–108. (Norops charlesmyersi, new combination, pp. 90, 93).

Anoles
Reptiles of Panama
Reptiles of Costa Rica
Reptiles described in 2010
Taxa named by Gunther Köhler